The 1933–34 season was the 35th season in the history of Berner Sport Club Young Boys. The team played their home games at Stadion Wankdorf in Bern.

Overview
In the domestic cup, Young Boys received a bye to the 1st principal round where they were defeated at home against Nordstern Basel.

Players
 Moggio
 Achille Siegrist
 Voléry
 Bertram Smith
 Mario Fasson
 Emil Messerli
 Best
 Erwin Hochstrasser
 Imrie
 Fritz Lehmann
 Herzog
  Charlie Handley

Friendlies

Competitions

Overall record

Nationalliga

1933/34 was the first season in which all teams played in a round-robin format. Before that, it was played in groups, and the Swiss champion was chosen via a play-off.

League table

Matches

Swiss Cup

References

BSC Young Boys seasons
Swiss football clubs 1933–34 season